Vilarroig is a surname. Notable people with the surname include:

Guillermo Vilarroig (born 1970), Spanish businessman
Pedro Vilarroig (born 1954), Spanish composer and academic